Md. Alamgir is a Bangladeshi former civil servant and one of the four incumbent Election Commissioners of Bangladesh. He is a former Senior Secretary of the Government of Bangladesh.

Early life 
Alamgir was born in Manikganj District. He has a degree in economics from the University of Dhaka.

Career 
Alamgir joined the admin branch of the Bangladesh Civil Service in 1986.

In May 2019, Alamgir was made the Secretary of the Election Commission.

Alamgir retired on 3 February 2021 and was replaced M Humayun Kabir Khandaker as secretary of the Election Commission.

On 26 February 2022, Alamgir was appointed an Election Commissioner of Bangladesh.

References 

Living people
University of Dhaka alumni
People from Manikganj District
Election Commissioners of Bangladesh
Year of birth missing (living people)